Snow White and the Seven Dwarfs (USA: Snow White) is a 1955 German film, directed by Erich Kobler, based on the 1812 story of Schneewittchen by the Brothers Grimm.

Plot 
Once upon a time, in a kingdom that is rich of nature, a Queen gives birth of little daughter who is because of her beauty called Snow White. The young Queen however dies in childbirth. Many years later, the King marries again to a beautiful but cold-hearted woman . The stepmother hates Snow White who has grown into a beautiful young woman.

The new Queen studies black magic and witchcraft. She is very vain and every day ask her ancient magic mirror: "Mirror mirror on the wall, who is the most beautiful of all?" When the mirror after many years reveals Snow White has become the most beautiful, the Queen kills the King and forces Snow White to work as a scullery maid.

Soon, a Prince from a neighbouring country rides on a hunt. He hears Snow White singing from the garden by the well. He climbs over the wall to meet her The two fall in love, as The Queen overhears them. She discovers that only by consuming Snow White's heart she can stay young and beautiful forever. She orders her Captain of The Guard to disguise as a Huntsman to take Snow White into the woods and kill her, as prove he is to bring back her heart and bloodstained clothing.

The Captain is repelled but takes Snow White into the woods where she picks flowers. When he draws his sword he can't bring himself to do it. He begs the Princess' forgiveness and the two create the illusion that Snow White is dead. She flees into the forest and the Huntsman returns the heart of an antelope to The Queen. Snow White runs through the forest that night and falls exhausted. The next morning, forest animals lead her to a sunny open space were a small wooden cottage. She finds the door is not locked and goes inside. Everything is very small and she assumes children live there. She cleans the home which is very untidy.

Overtaken by sleepiness she goes upstairs and finds seven little beds with seven names carved in them: Doc, Grumpy, Happy, Sleepy, Bashful, Sneezy and Dopey. Snow White falls over the seven beds and falls asleep. Miles away in a diamond mine the seven dwarves who live in the cottage are digging for jewels. At noon, they travel home over the seven falls. They find the chimney smoking and go inside. Dopey goes upstairs and finds Snow White in bed. The dwarves are enchanted by her beauty. Snow White wakes and tells the dwarves her story. The dwarves want to let her stay except Grumpy who is reluctant.

But when they learn Snow White can cook, they decide she may stay. That night, they throw a joyful party in Snow White's honor. The next morning, the dwarves go to get water for her. Back at the castle, The Queen consults her mirror who reveals that Snow White is alive and with the seven dwarves. The Queen goes to the dungeons and has the Huntsman stretched on the rack. In her magical laboratory, she makes a potion which turns her into an old Witch. The Witch poisons an apple and travels to the cottage.

Cast 
 Elke Arendt – Snow White
 Adele "Addi" Adametz – The Evil Queen, Snow White's evil stepmother
 Niels Clausnitzer – Prince Edelmunt
 Dietrich Thoms – The Huntsman
 Renate Eichholz – The Good Queen, Snow White's mother
 Zita Hitz – Francisca, the Chambermaid
 Erwin Platzer – The Little Moor

Production
Neuschwanstein Castle, in Bavaria, Germany was used as a film set.

The Seven Dwarfs were all played by children from children's dance group led by Suse Böhm.

Home media 
In 2007, Schneewittchen was released on DVD in Germany.  The film was also part of five DVD boxset, which contained other classic live-action German fairytale films made in the 1950s.

In 2003, the American English-dubbed DVD version was released officially in the United States by Catcom Home Video/Krb Music and then re-issued in 2007. PR Studios then re-issued the DVD in 2008.

External links 
 1965 English-dubbed full movie
 
 Photo gallery
 

1955 films
1950s fantasy films
German fantasy films
West German films
Films based on Snow White
German children's films
1950s German films